Lalgudi division is a revenue division in the Tiruchirapalli district of Tamil Nadu, India. It comprises the taluks of Manachanallur and Lalgudi. Town of lalgudi is the headquarters of lalgudi revenue division. It is the one of three revenue divisions in the district of Tiruchirapalli.

Urbans in the division
lalgudi,
manachanallur,
dalmiapuram,
pullambadi,
samayapuram,
Tolgate.

References

 

Tiruchirappalli district